Year 1330 (MCCCXXX) was a common year starting on Monday (link will display the full calendar) of the Julian calendar.

Events 
 January–December 
 July 28 – Battle of Velbazhd: The Bulgarians under Tsar Michael Shishman (who is mortally wounded) are beaten by the Serbs. Bulgaria does not lose any territory to Serbia, but is powerless to stop the Serbian advance towards the predominantly Bulgarian-populated Macedonia.
 October 19 – King Edward III of England starts his personal reign, arresting his regent Roger Mortimer, and having him executed.
 November 9–12 – Battle of Posada: The Wallachians, under Basarab I, defeat the Hungarians, though heavily outnumbered, thus making a firm statement towards the independence of Wallachia.
 December 6 – The British Isles are hit by a great storm, creating large areas of sand dunes on Anglesey.
 Undated – Vilnius, Lithuania receives its coat-of-arms, granted to the city in the seventh year of its existence.
 Undated – Ivan Alexander becomes the despot of Lovech.

Births 
 June 15 – Edward, the Black Prince, son of Edward III of England (d. 1376)
 July 4 – Ashikaga Yoshiakira, Japanese shōgun (d. 1367)
 October 25 – Louis II of Flanders (d. 1384)
 date unknown
 Frans Ackerman, Flemish statesman (d. 1387)
 Euphemia of Sicily, princess regent of Sicily (d. 1359)
 Altichiero, Italian painter (d. 1390)
 Nicolas Flamel, French scribe and manuscript-seller, reputed alchemist (d. 1417)
 John Gower, English poet (d. 1410)

Deaths 
 January 13 – Duke Frederick I of Austria (b. 1286)
 January 21 – Joan II, Countess of Burgundy, queen dowager of France (b. 1291)
 March 19 – Edmund of Woodstock, 1st Earl of Kent, son of Edward I and brother of Edward II (executed by Roger Mortimer) (b. 1301)
 May 3 – Alexios II Megas Komnenos, Emperor of Trebizond (b. 1282)
 c. July 31 – Tsar Michael Shishman of Bulgaria (b. 1280s?)
 August 25 – On or about this date, Sir James Douglas, Scottish guerilla leader during the Wars of Scottish Independence (b. circa 1286)
 September 28 – Elizabeth of Bohemia, queen consort of Bohemia (b. 1292)
 November 29 – Roger Mortimer, 1st Earl of March, de facto ruler of England (b. 1287)
 date unknown
 Pietro Cavallini, Italian artist (b. 1259)
 Guillaume Durand, French clergyman
 Immanuel the Roman, Italian scholar and poet (b. 1270)
 Maximus Planudes, Byzantine grammarian and theologian
 Uthman ibn Abi al-Ula, Marinid prince and shaykh al-ghuzat of the Emirate of Granada

References